Kinetics (movement or to move) may refer to:

Science and medicine 
 Kinetics (physics), the study of motion and its causes
 Rigid body kinetics, the study of the motion of rigid bodies
 Chemical kinetics, the study of chemical reaction rates
Enzyme kinetics, the study of biochemical reaction rates catalysed by an enzyme
 Michaelis–Menten kinetics, the widely accepted general model of enzyme kinetics
 Goldbeter–Koshland kinetics, describe a steady-state solution for a 2-state biological system
 Langmuir–Hinshelwood kinetics
Receptor–ligand kinetics, a branch of chemical kinetics in which the kinetic species are defined by different non-covalent bindings and/or conformations of the molecules involved, which are denoted as receptor(s) and ligand(s)
Hill kinetics
Pharmacokinetics, the study of the processes a substance undergoes in the animal body, particularly the rates at which it is absorbed, distributed, metabolised and excreted
One-compartment kinetics, for a chemical compound specifies that the uptake in the compartment is proportional to the concentration outside the compartment, and the elimination is proportional to the concentration inside the compartment
Flip-flop kinetics, the pharmacokinetics of sustained-release or extended-release drug formulations
 Toxicokinetics, the branch of pharmacokinetics dealing with compounds that are toxic or can be administered in toxic doses
 Human kinetics or kinesiology, the study of human biomechanical movement
 C0t analysis, also known as DNA recombination kinetics

Companies 
 Kinetics (company), a technology company
 KinetX, an aerospace engineering company
 ST Kinetics, a weaponry and specialty vehicle manufacturer
 Color Kinetics, a former lighting company, now part of the Philips group of companies

Arts and entertainment 
Kinetics (rapper), rapper and songwriter from New York City

Other uses 
Kinetics Internet Protocol (KIP), an AppleTalk network protocol
NASCAR Kinetics, a semester-long experiential program offered to several American universities
 Kinetic activity (military terminology)

See also
 Dynamics (disambiguation)
Kinetic (disambiguation)
Kinematics, a branch of classical mechanics that describes the motion of particles (alternatively "points"), objects ("bodies"), and groups of objects ("systems of bodies") without considering the mass of each or the forces that caused the motion
Analytical mechanics, a collection of closely related alternative formulations of classical mechanics
Analytical dynamics, concerned about the relationship between motion of bodies and its causes, namely the forces acting on the bodies and the properties of the bodies (particularly mass and moment of inertia)